Hanna Nooni (born 9 March 1984) is a former Swedish tennis player.

In her career, she won five ITF singles (Madrid, Vittel, Portschach, Båstad and Garching) and three ITF doubles titles.

Career
In 2006, Nooni had wrist surgery and returned to action in St Paul (February 2007). Her best surface is clay. She played doubles with Erica Krauth of Argentina, and the pair won two ITF titles (Charlottesville, Båstad). Hanna's career-high singles ranking is No. 152 (18 July 2005). On 13 July 2009, she peaked at No. 146 in the doubles rankings.

Nooni played for the Sweden Fed Cup team from 2003 to 2005, playing eight singles matches, of which she won two, and six doubles matches, of which she also won two.

ITF Circuit finals

Singles: 8 (5–3)

Doubles: 13 (3–10)

External links
 
 
 
 

Swedish female tennis players
1984 births
Living people
Place of birth missing (living people)
20th-century Swedish women
21st-century Swedish women